The Peugeot Type 4 was a one-off car produced by Peugeot in 1892 for Ali III ibn al-Husayn, the Bey of Tunis, in accordance with whose wishes the car was decorated.

Details
The Type 4 was made with a 1.0 L (1026 cc) 15-degree V-twin engine that produced 4 horsepower.  The 0.6 L (565 cc) engine in the Peugeot Type 3 was considered to be insufficient, and produced half as much power.  The elaborately decorated car survives and is kept at Sochaux, France.

References

1890s cars
Type 4
Rear-engined vehicles
Vehicles introduced in 1892